The Battle of Calpulalpan took place on December 22, 1860 during the War of Reform in the vicinity of the community of San Miguel de la Victoria in the municipality of Jilotepec de Abasolo in the State of Mexico, Mexico. It would be the last battle of the War of Reform (1858-1860).

Contenders 
In the first stage of the conflict the balance seemed to tilt in favor of the conservatives, who had the support of most of the formal army, but gradually the trend was reversing, until in Calpulalpan, the conservative party his last card played with his best General Miguel Miramon, commanding eight thousand soldiers, thirty guns and some of the most experienced officers as Leonardo Márquez, Francisco A. Velez, Miguel Negrete and Marcelino Cobos.

Liberal army troops, commanded by General Jesus Gonzalez Ortega who was the general Ignacio Zaragoza, Leandro Valle, Nicolas Régules and Francisco Alatorre with a force of 11,000 men and 14 pieces of artillery under his command. His army was formed by the republican guerrillas who had risen against the coup three years ago and, despite not having mostly military education were hardened soldiers in the battlefields.

Background 
After the conquest of Guadalajara on 3 November 1860 the liberals seized the military initiative. They began to gain territories heading toward the Mexican capital. To stop the advance of their enemies General Miramon left Mexico City being constantly harassed by the liberal guerrillas operating around the city.

While General Gonzalez Ortega advanced to meet him with 20,000 men.

Both armies met in Calpulalpan on December 21 and after failing the negotiations were prepared for the decisive battle that would determine the war.

Battle 
The next day despite their numerical inferiority, 8:00 am Miramon began an attack on the liberal left wing taking advantage of the superiority of their artillery, being counterattacked two hours later, by the superior forces of Zaragoza on their own right flank, and by Régules in the middle. At the same time, General Gonzalez Ortega, Leandro Valle and Alatorre advanced to wrap conservatives in the rear, in a move that decided the action of arms and the liberal victory. The Conservative army was completely destroyed. Gonzalez Ortega headed the end of the battle pursuing the decimated conservatives, resulting in a total defeat for the Conservative army.

Miramón escaped and returned to Mexico City in search of support, where he managed to gather 1,500 men but they soon defected. Knowing that the war was a lost cause, he left the capital and fled toward Veracruz days later to Havana, Cuba, from where he left for France. He would not return until during the French Intervention.

Consequences 
The victory of this battle marked the end of the War of Reform and Conservative caused the disintegration of the army. On 25 December at Christmas 1860, General Gonzalez Ortega made his triumphant return to Mexico City in front of 30,000 troops input, thus ending the war with the triumph of liberal side in the War of Reform. On January 5 President Benito Juarez entered the capital from Veracruz marking the official end of hostilities. However, although they were defeated, the Marquez and Tomas Mejia Cobos general continued to resist in some conservative foci. Thus, the secular and republican state said in Mexican history by subjecting the powerful corporations that influenced decisively in the direction of the country: The Church and the Army.

References 

1860 in Mexico
Conflicts in 1860
Reform War